A District (or ;  or  or ) is the highest level of administrative divisions of Kosovo. The districts of Kosovo are based on the 2000 Reform of the UNMIK-Administration.

UNMIK reform of 2000
The United Nations Interim Administration Mission in Kosovo (UNMIK) introduced the following changes to the districts and municipalities of Kosovo (UNMIK) in 2000:
 The Kosovska Mitrovica District  became the District of Mitrovica.
 The Peć District was split into the District of Peja and the District of Gjakova.
 Additionally, the municipality of Orahovac was transferred to the District of Gjakova.
 The Kosovo District was split into the District of Pristina and District of Ferizaj.
 The Kosovo-Pomoravlje District was renamed into the District of Gjilan. 
 Additionally, it transferred the municipality of Novo Brdo to the District of Pristina.
 The District of Prizren was reformed as following:
 it merged the municipalities of Gora and Opolje into the new municipality of Dragaš
 it formed the new municipality Mališevo by taking territories from the municipalities of Orahovac (District of Gjakova), Suva Reka (District of Prizren), Klina (District of Peja) and Drenas (District of Pristina).

Serbia protested the new territorial division and does not see it as legitimate, but by the United Nations Mission in Kosovo administration (UNMIK) implemented it regardless of Serbia's protests, because it has such authority established by virtue of the United Nations Security Council Resolution 1244.

Districts of Kosovo

Changes

See also
 Districts of Kosovo and Metohija
List of districts of Kosovo by Human Development Index

 Administrative divisions of Kosovo
 Municipalities of Kosovo
 Cities and towns in Kosovo
 Populated places in Kosovo
 Populated places in Kosovo by Albanian name

Notes and references
Notes:

References:

 
Subdivisions of Kosovo